The Toyo Kukku T-T.10 is a low wing, single engine training aircraft which seats two in tandem.  It was designed and built in Japan in 1952.

Development
Toyo Aircraft was established in June 1952 and their first aircraft, the T-T.10, was completed by the end of the year. It is of mixed construction; the wing is built entirely from wood and fabric around two spars, with a plywood skin enclosed within fabric.  The flaps and ailerons are wood framed and fabric covered. In planform the wings are straight tapered with rounded tips; most of the taper is on the trailing edge. There is 6° of dihedral. The T-T.10's tail surfaces are also straight tapered with rounded tips, generally wood framed with fabric covering.  Its horizontal tail is mounted at the top of the fuselage. The  elevators have a cut-out to allow rudder movement, as the latter extends down to the keel. There is a trim tab on the port elevator.

The fuselage of the T-T.10 is fabric covered over a welded chrome-molybdenum steel frame. The engine is a 140 hp (104 kW) Lycoming O-290-D2 flat four, driving a two-bladed propeller. Student and instructor sit in tandem with dual controls under a multi-framed, continuous, two part sliding canopy. The rear fuselage line is raised compared with the forward section, but not to the full canopy height. The T-T.10 has conventional landing gear, with narrowly faired cantilever, coil spring damped mainlegs and a tailwheel.

The first T-T.10, registration JA3026, flew for the first time on 30 December 1952; the first production model (JA3049) followed soon after, on 11 February 1953. Production numbers are not known exactly; one report speaks of a "small batch" but only the first two T-T.10s appear in the single engine serial range JA3001 - JA3100, which covers the period August 1952 to September 1955, so they may constitute the whole batch.

Aircraft on display
Tokyo Metropolitan College F.A.M.E. Gallery: T-T.10 JA3026

Specifications

References

External links
NACA 2410 airfoil
Photo of a Toyo T-T.10

1950s Japanese aircraft